Pakkins' Land is an epic all-ages fantasy story created by husband and wife team, Gary and Rhoda Shipman. Originating as a critically hailed comic book series, the story was written by the pair with Gary Shipman illustrating the series.

Pakkins’ Land tells the tale of Paul, a young boy who finds himself in a magical world filled with talking animals, mystery and excitement.

Publication history 
1995 saw the first appearance of Pakkins' Land in the form of black & white xeroxed copied issues called ashcans. Because of the nature of these first three issues being creator-produced, they were very low-edition, and as such have since become extremely rare.

In October 1996 the independent comic book company, Caliber Comics, began publishing the first of the six issue monthly series (including republishing the ashcan editions), Pakkins' Land: Paul's Adventure, as its flagship title in launching an all-ages imprint, Tapestry. The issues consist of black & white interior pages with full-color covers that become the series published format for almost the entire next decade.

In June 1997 Tapestry published the stand-alone Pakkins' Land Issue # 0, to serve as a prologue to the Pakkins' Land series.

With the first six-issue story arc concluded, in August 1997 Caliber began publishing (under its own label after dissolving the Tapestry imprint) the second six-issue installment of the series, Pakkins' Land: Quest For Kings, which continued the overall story. Issue # 1 was published with two variant covers, one which featured the art of Jeff Smith of Bone fame.

Starting in September 1997 the Pakkins' Land saga was further serialized in 17 short offshoot stories as a full-color weekly webcomic strip presented by online comics' retailer, mania.com.

In October 1997 Caliber repackaged the entire six issues of Pakkins' Land: Paul's Adventure and the Pakkins' Land Issue # 0, publishing it as a trade paperback entitled: Pakkins' Land: Paul's Adventure.

In November 1997, with Issue # 3, Pakkins' Land: Quest For Kings began a bi-monthly publishing schedule.

In April 1998 Caliber began publishing Pakkins' Land: Forgotten Dreams. Caliber ultimately published only three issues of the four issue series.

In December 1998 Caliber published A Caliber Christmas which featured a seven-page Pakkins' Land story, entitled: Pakkins' Land: Christmas Remembered.

In March 2000 Image Comics published a larger-sized Issue # 4, which wrapped up the Pakkins' Land: Forgotten Dreams story arc.

In 2000 Pakkins' Land Volume One: Paul's Adventure, Revised Edition  was published as a trade paperback by the Shipman's own self-publishing imprint, Pakkins Presents. The graphic novel features a revised look at the first six-issue series, including additional new art and writing.

In 2001 the trade paperbacks Pakkins' Land Volume Two: Quest For Kings  and Pakkins' Land Volume Three: Forgotten Dreams  were published by Pakkins Presents.

In April 2003 the trade paperback Pakkins' Land Volume Four: Tavitah  was published by Pakkins Presents.

In May 2005, Pakkins' Land was realized for the first time in complete full-color as the independent comic book company, Alias Enterprises 1, began publishing a newly revised edition of the series as a monthly title.

In 2011, Pakkins' Land The Complete Series: Volume 1 (of 5) Presented in the original black-and-white, includes a foreword by comic veteran Jim Krueger, an all-new original painted cover and special features inside. Volume One was released by the publishing company, Lamp Post Inc.

In 2012, Pakkins' Land The Complete Series: Volume 2 (of 5) Presented in the original black-and-white, includes a foreword by comic creator Gary Shipman, an all-new original painted cover and special features inside. Volume Two was released by the publishing company, Lamp Post Inc.

In 2013, Pakkins' Land The Complete Series: Volume 3 (of 5) Presented in the original black-and-white, includes a foreword by writer James Pruett, an all-new original painted cover and special features inside. Volume Three was released by the publishing company, Lamp Post Inc.

In July 2018, Pakkins Land creator Gary Shipman, in a live stream on his YouTube channel, announced he was working on new material to continue the series. By December 2018, Shipman had announced during his live streams that he was working on an Omnibus edition of the series which would feature over 400 pages of art, and began drawing new story art for it during those streams.

Reception
Receiving accolades from both fans and critics alike, the series has been compared to The Wizard of Oz and The Chronicles of Narnia, and garnered award recognition. (See also: Awards)

Cold Cut Distribution called Pakkins' Land "A charming fantasy full of childlike wonder" and wrote: "'There aren't enough comics out there for younger readers,' say some shop owners. 'Or for the child in all of us,' I agree. Luckily, here's one more."

Characters 

 Paul - Human
 Mr. Brambles - Bear
 Gus - Jackal
 Tikvah - Flying Squirrel 
 Aryah - Lion (The King)
 Rahsha - Human (The Evil King)
 Sedek - Human (The King)
 Shani - Wolf
 Hazak - Gorilla
 Lila - Racoon

 Jeremiah - Elephant
 Nahmer - Tiger
 Sampson - Killer Whale
 Twila - Dolphin
 Kafatz - Kangaroo
 Tamarah - Elephant
 Tavitah - Human (Princess)
 Pip - Bat (Dark Flyer)
 Adelbert - Rabbit

Books 
The work is (thus far) composed of 4 volumes:

Pakkins' Land Volume One: Paul's Adventure

Novel
 published 2000
 Chapter 1: My Adventure
 Chapter 2: The Long Way!
 Chapter 3: Cliff Hanger
 Chapter 4: The Awakening
 Chapter 5: Death Ridge

Comic Book 
 Issue # 1: Paul's Adventure
 Issue # 2: The Long Way!
 Issue # 3: Cliff Hanger
 Issue # 4: Death Ridge
 Issue # 5: Stranger In A Strange Land
 Issue # 6: The Gathering

Pakkins' Land Volume Two: Quest For Kings

Novel
 published 2001
 Chapter 1: Quest For Kings
 Chapter 2: The Gathering
 Chapter 3: The Captive
 Chapter 4: ...And A Little Child Shall Lead Them
 Chapter 5: Forbidden City

Comic Book 

 Issue # 1: Quest For Kings 
 Issue # 2: ...And A Little Child Shall Lead Them
 Issue # 3: Forbidden City
 Issue # 4: The Rescuers
 Issue # 5: The Confrontation
 Issue # 6: Stand Off!

Pakkins' Land Volume Three: Forgotten Dreams

Novel
 published 2001
 Chapter 1: Cave In
 Chapter 2: The Symbol
 Chapter 3: Rasha's Dungeon
 Chapter 4: The Confrontation
 Chapter 5: The Healer

Comic Book 
 Issue # 1: Forgotten Dreams
 Issue # 2: Awake Sleeper!
 Issue # 3: Strange Dreams
 Issue # 4: These Dreams (published by Image Comics)

Pakkins' Land Volume Four: Tavitah

Novel
 published April 2003
 Chapter 1: The Change
 Chapter 2: Awake Sleeper!
 Chapter 3: Strange Dreams
 Chapter 4: These Dreams

Awards 
 1997 Harvey Award Nominee in the category of Best New Talent .
 1997 Russ Manning Award Nominee for Most Promising Newcomer.
 1998 Eisner Award Nominee in the category of Talent Deserving Of Wider Recognition.

External links
 Coverbrowser.com - Pakkins Land

References

Caliber Comics titles
Image Comics titles
Alias Enterprises titles
American graphic novels
Christian comics
Fantasy comics
1995 comics debuts
Comics characters introduced in 1995